Ernest Glennie (8 February 1870— 16 July 1908) was a New Zealand rugby union player who represented the New Zealand national team, the All Blacks in 1897. His positions of choice were halfback, five-eighth and wing-forward.

He was understood to have been born in Queenstown.

Career 
Glennie initially played for the Pirates club in Invercargill.

He then moved to Canterbury, and played for the Linwood club in Christchurch. It was here Glennie made the Canterbury provincial side, playing nine games between 1896 and 1897. He played mostly as a forward.

He was described as a "speedy wing-forward".

After playing in the inaugural South against North Island match in 1897, Glennie was selected for the 11-match tour of Australia, that same year.

Glennie played in six matches on the tour, three of these played as a wing-forward (modern day flanker), two as a halfback and one as a five-eighth.

He scored four tries as an All Black totalling twelve points.

References 

New Zealand rugby union players
New Zealand international rugby union players
1908 deaths
Rugby union flankers
Rugby union wing-forwards
1870 births
Rugby union players from Otago